Patterson is a city in Stanislaus County, California, United States, located off Interstate 5. Patterson is known as the "Apricot Capital of the World"; the town holds an annual Apricot Fiesta to celebrate with many drinks, food, desserts and games. The population was 20,413 at the 2010 Census.

History
The history of Patterson begins with the Rancho Del Puerto Mexican Land Grant to Mariano and Pedro Hernandez in 1844 by Governor Manuel Micheltorena. The grant extended east of the present-day Highway 33 to the San Joaquin River. The northern boundary was Del Puerto Creek and the southern boundary was just south of present-day Marshall Road.

Samuel G. Reed and Ruben S. Wade made claim to the land on January 7, 1855. A patent encompassing the land grant was signed by President Abraham Lincoln. Reed and Wade then sold the grant to J. O. Eldredge on June 18, 1866, for $5,000. Mr. Eldredge held the title for only two months before selling it to John D. Patterson on August 14, 1866, for $5,400. The land was sold to the Patterson Ranch Company on May 16, 1908, for the sum of $540,000 cash gold coin. Thomas W. Patterson subdivided the land into ranches of various sizes and plotted the design of the town of Patterson. Determined to make Patterson different from most, he modeled his town after the cities of Washington, D.C. and Paris, France, using a series of circles and radiating streets. Major streets were planted with palm, eucalyptus, and sycamore trees.

The Patterson Colony map was filed with the Stanislaus County Recorders office on December 13, 1909. Sales of the ranch properties and city lots commenced. Patterson was the third city in Stanislaus County to incorporate on December 22, 1919. In May 1971, the chamber of commerce approved the title of "Apricot Capital of the World" for Patterson.

Geography
Patterson is located at  (37.472984, -121.132867).

Demographics

2010
The 2010 United States Census reported that Patterson had a population of 20,413. The racial makeup of Patterson was 10,117 (49.6%) White, 1,291 (6.3%) African American, 221 (1.1%) Native American, 1,069 (5.2%) Asian, 280 (1.4%) Pacific Islander, 6,235 (30.5%) from other races, and 1,200 (5.9%) from two or more races. Hispanic or Latino of any race were 11,971 persons (58.6%).

The Census reported that 20,410 people (100% of the population) lived in households, 3 (0%) lived in non-institutionalized group quarters, and 0 (0%) were institutionalized.

There were 5,630 households, out of which 3,162 (56.2%) had children under the age of 18 living in them, 3,398 (60.4%) were opposite-sex married couples living together, 758 (13.5%) had a female householder with no husband present, 491 (8.7%) had a male householder with no wife present. There were 453 (8.0%) unmarried opposite-sex partnerships, and 47 (0.8%) same-sex married couples or partnerships. 716 households (12.7%) were made up of individuals, and 273 (4.8%) had someone living alone who was 65 years of age or older. The average household size was 3.63. There were 4,647 families (82.5% of all households); the average family size was 3.95.

The population was spread out, with 6,890 people (33.8%) under the age of 18, 2,140 people (10.5%) aged 18 to 24, 5,822 people (28.5%) aged 25 to 44, 4,280 people (21.0%) aged 45 to 64, and 1,281 people (6.3%) who were 65 years of age or older. The median age was 29.1 years. For every 100 females, there were 101.1 males.  For every 100 females age 18 and over, there were 98.0 males.

The homeowner vacancy rate was 4.5%; the rental vacancy rate was 5.7%. 13,304 people (65.2% of the population) lived in owner-occupied housing units and 7,106 people (34.8%) lived in rental housing units.

2000
As of the census of 2000, there were 11,606 people, 3,146 households, and 2,608 families residing in the city. The population density was 1,561.4/km2 (4,037.5/mi2). There were 3,262 housing units at an average density of 438.8/km2 (1,134.8/mi2). The racial makeup of the city was 55.65% White, 1.89% African American, 1.47% Native American, 2.10% Asian, 0.42% Pacific Islander, 31.54% from other races, and 6.92% from two or more races. 56.96% of the population were Hispanic or Latino of any race.

There were 3,146 households, out of which 53.1% had children under the age of 18 living with them, 64.9% were married couples living together, 12.1% had a female householder with no husband present, and 17.1% were non-families. 13.4% of all households were made up of individuals, and 7.0% had someone living alone who was 65 years of age or older. The average household size was 3.62 and the average family size was 3.94.

In the city, the population was spread out, with 36.4% under the age of 18, 10.3% from 18 to 24, 30.0% from 25 to 44, 16.0% from 45 to 64, and 7.2% who were 65 years of age or older. The median age was 28 years. For every 100 females, there were 100.4 males. For every 100 females age 18 and over, there were 97.6 males.

The median income for a household in the city was $47,780, and the median income for a family was $51,422. Males had a median income of $36,207 versus $27,679 for females. The per capita income for the city was $14,746. 12.0% of the population and 8.6% of families were below the poverty line. Out of the total population, 11.5% of those under the age of 18 and 15.2% of those 65 and older were living below the poverty line.

Government

State and national

Local
The city council consists of five representatives, the mayor is elected to two-year terms and four council members are each elected in district elections to four-year terms on a staggered basis; this means that every two years there are either two council seats and the Mayor seat up for election.  The current council consists of Mayor Dennis McCord and Council members Shivaughn Alves (District A), Al Parham (District B), Dominic Farinha (District C), and Cynthia Homen (District D).  The City Council appoints a city manager, who hires all city staff and manages the day-to-day business of the city.  Advisory bodies work with the city council and identify issues before the council makes final decisions.  Advisory body members are appointed by the mayor, subject to the approval of a majority of the council.

Public safety
Patterson previously had a local police department. In 1998, it was merged into the Stanislaus County Sheriff's Department. The county sheriff's department, through a contract with the city, provides services through Patterson Police Services.

Culture

Media
The daily newspaper in Patterson is the Patterson Irrigator, which was founded in 1911. It's located in downtown Patterson and has been at the same location since 1929. The Irrigator, since 2009, is published weekly.

Patterson is also the city of license for two radio stations, the iHeartRadio-affiliated country music channel KOSO and Spanish contemporary hit radio channel KTSE-FM.

Celebrations
During the first weekend in June, Downtown Patterson hosts the town's largest celebration of the year, the Apricot Fiesta. The event begins on Friday with several beauty pageants. The Patterson Library hosts an art show during the celebration, and displays on local history are held open to the public at the Patterson Museum, also known as the Center Building and located at the center of Patterson.  The three-day celebration also features fireworks shows and, during early mornings, hot air balloons departing from the football stadium at Patterson High School.  This celebration typically takes place on the first weekend of June.

In recent years Patterson has also been the site of the Fiestas Patrias celebration, commemorating the independence of various Latin American countries.  This celebration is held in mid-September.

Education
The Patterson Joint Unified School District serves more than 5,669 students and operates four elementary schools, one middle school, one comprehensive high school, and one continuation high school.

Transportation
Major highways include Interstate 5 and State Route 33. Patterson is also the eastern terminus of State Route 130 as defined by state legislation, although the route is unbuilt in Stanislaus County. A freeway has been proposed for construction along this route, passing directly through the Diablo Range west of the city toward the San Francisco Bay Area.

Public transit service is operated by the Stanislaus Regional Transit Authority, including commuter service to Dublin/Pleasanton station.

Notable people
 Amy Franceschini, artist

References

External links
 
 Visit Patterson CA, official tourism website of Patterson
 Patterson-Westley Chamber of Commerce

Cities in Stanislaus County, California
Incorporated cities and towns in California
Populated places established in 1909
1909 establishments in California